Virgili is a surname. Notable people with the surname include:

Antoni Rovira i Virgili (1882–1949), Catalan politician
Antonio Virgili (born 1957), Italian professor
Albert Virgili (born 1983), Spanish footballer
Fabio Virgili (born 1986), Italian footballer
Fernando Virgili (1913-2007), Italian professor and veteran
Giuseppe Virgili, Italian footballer
James Virgili (born 1992), Australian soccer player
Josep Abril i Virgili (1869–1918), Catalan poet and playwright
Pedro Virgili (1699–1776), Spanish surgeon